Occasus (Latin "setting (of the sun)") is the first studio release album by industrial/experimental metal
band The Amenta. The album won them the Best Metal Newcomers award for 2004 by the Australian edition of Kerrang! magazine. The album also contains multimedia content including a detailed discography, promotional photos, lyrics and songs on the downloadable ambient album "Soundtrack To A Hidden Earth". The album was re-released in 2007 with four bonus tracks, originally from the Mictlan E.P., along with the DVD 'Virus'.

Track listing
 Erebus  – 4:09
 Mictlan  – 4:52
 Zero  – 4:16
 Senium  – 2:04
 Nihil  – 5:19
 Geilt  – 4:15
 Sekem  – 4:46
 Occasus  – 3:10
 Ennea  – 4:10
 Sangre  – 4:56
 Inritus - 1:14*
 Mictlan 2002 - 5:05*
 Ennea 2002 - 4:09*
 Nekuia - 1:54*

Bonus tracks on the 2007 re-issue.

Credits

Personnel
Erik Miehs - guitar
Timothy Pope - keyboards, samples, programming
Mark Bevan - vocals
Nathan Jenkins - bass guitar
Dave Haley - drums

Production
Lachlan Mitchell - producer, mixing, mastering

References

2004 debut albums
The Amenta albums